Senator Barnett may refer to:

Guy Barnett (Australian politician) (born 1962), Senate of Australia
James Barnett (New York politician) (1810–1874), New York State Senate
Jim Barnett (Kansas politician) (born 1955), Kansas State Senate
Juan Barnett (born 1970), Mississippi State Senate
Mickey D. Barnett, New Mexico State Senate
William Barnett (Georgia politician) (1761–1832), Georgia State Senate